Hartford is a surname that means 'the place where deer cross'. Notable instances of the surname include:

 Asa Hartford (b. 1950) Scottish Footballer
 George Huntington Hartford (1833–1917) co-founder of The Great Atlantic & Pacific Tea Company
 George Ludlum Hartford (1864–1957) heir to The Great Atlantic & Pacific Tea Company and co-founder of the John A. Hartford Foundation 
 John Augustine Hartford (1872–1951) heir to The Great Atlantic & Pacific Tea Company and co-founder of the John A. Hartford Foundation
 Huntington Hartford (1911–2008) heir to The Great Atlantic & Pacific Tea Company fortune and developer of Paradise Island, Bahamas
 John A. Hartford Foundation (1929– ) a U.S. private philanthropic foundation
 John Hartford (1937–2001), American country/bluegrass musician
 Jeff Hartford, Canadian DJ and producer

Fictional characters:
 Walter "Doc" Hartford, character from The Adventures of the Galaxy Rangers
 Andrew Hartford, character from Power Rangers Operation Overdrive